Boat building on Man-O-War Cay  in Bahamas dates back to the 1880s. During the middle of the last century, numerous boat yards lined the harbor.

William H. Albury (“Uncle Will”) built some of the largest boat yards in Man-O-Way Cay.  When a big boat was under construction, he might employ 15 or 20 men to work on her. Many of these men also had small yards where they built smaller boats –  "Abaco Dinghies" which became the backbone of the fishing and commercial industry of the Bahamas.

In 1960, Edwin Albury started Edwin's Boat Yard. He, Keith Albury and Darvin Sands built boats of varying sizes during the 60s and were joined by Blake Albury in 1969. Edwin Albury expanded in 1976 when he bought out William H. Albury.

Joe Albury now builds Abaco Dinghies in his yard. And Willard's sons, Don and Jamie, of Albury Brothers Boats build modern center-console and runabout boats in their facility next to the water.

This page is intended to archive the names of the boat builders and boats built on Man-O-War Cay from the 1800s into the late 1900s.

Boats built on Man-O-War Cay in the 1900s

Man-O-War Cay Boat Builders during the 1800s

Man-O-War Cay Boat Builders during the 1900s

Man-O-War Cay Boatbuilding slide show video
The following table is an index of the video, Boatbuilding on Abaco Thesis Collection (M.A.).  The video was made by Sister Patricia Ann Finnerty in 1973.

References

External links 
 Boatbuilding on Abaco Thesis Collection (M.A.).

External links
Map of MOW Boat Yards in the 40s, 50s and 60s
Man-O-War Heritage Archive
Man-O'-War Cay, Abacos settled by Loyalists, Boat builders of the Bahamas (submission pending)

Boat building
Ships built in the Bahamas